Louisiana Highway 817 (LA 817) is a collection of one current and two former state-maintained streets in the Lincoln Parish village of Simsboro.  All three routes were established in the 1955 Louisiana Highway renumbering.



Louisiana Highway 817-1

Louisiana Highway 817-1 (LA 817-1) ran  in a north–south direction from the junction of US 80 and LA 507 to a junction with a local road.  It was an undivided two-lane highway for its entire length.  Most of the route is now part of LA 507, which was extended northward to connect with I-20.

Louisiana Highway 817-2

Louisiana Highway 817-2 (LA 817-2) ran  in a loop off of US 80 around Simsboro High School.  It was an undivided two-lane highway for its entire length.  The route was returned to local control in 2008.

Louisiana Highway 817-3

It is an undivided two-lane highway for its entire length.

References

External links
 La DOTD State, District, and Parish Maps

0817
Transportation in Lincoln Parish, Louisiana